The FIS Snowboarding World Championships 1999 took place between January 12 and January 19 in Berchtesgaden, Germany.

Results

Men's Results

Snowboard Cross
The Snowboard Cross finals took place on January 17.

Giant Slalom
Giant Slalom finals took place on January 13.

Parallel Giant Slalom
Parallel Giant Slalom finals took place on January 14.

Parallel Slalom
The Parallel Slalom finals took place on January 15.

Halfpipe
The finals took place on January 16.

Women's Events

Snowboard Cross
The Snowboard Cross finals took place on January 17.

Giant Slalom
Giant Slalom finals took place on January 12.

Parallel Giant Slalom
Parallel Giant Slalom finals took place on January 14.

Parallel Slalom
The Parallel Slalom finals took place on January 15.

Halfpipe
The finals took place on January 16.

Medal table

References

1999
1999 in German sport
1999 in snowboarding